Josef Miner (15 July 1914 in Breslau, German Empire – 1944 in Huși, Romania) was a German boxer who competed in the 1936 Summer Olympics. In 1936 he won the bronze medal in the featherweight class after winning the third-place bout versus Hungary's Dezső Frigyes.

He was killed in action during World War II.

1936 Olympic results
Below are the results of Josef Miner, a featherweight boxer, who competed for Germany at the 1936 Berlin Olympics:

 Round of 32: defeated Khalil Amira El-Maghrabi (Egypt) on points
 Round of 16: defeated Remi Lescrauwaet (Belgium) on points
 Quarterfinal: defeated John Treadaway (Great Britain) on points
 Semifinal: lost to Charles Catterall (South Africa) on points
 Bronze Medal Bout: defeated Dezso Frigyes (Hungary) on points (was awarded the bronze medal)

References

External links
 profile

1914 births
1944 deaths
Sportspeople from Wrocław
People from the Province of Silesia
Featherweight boxers
Olympic boxers of Germany
Boxers at the 1936 Summer Olympics
Olympic bronze medalists for Germany
Olympic medalists in boxing
German male boxers
German Army  personnel killed in World War II
Medalists at the 1936 Summer Olympics